Gary Joseph Finneran (born February 23, 1934) is a former American football player who played with the Los Angeles Chargers and Oakland Raiders of the American Football League (AFL). He played college football at the University of Southern California.

References

1934 births
Living people
American football defensive ends
USC Trojans football players
Los Angeles Chargers players
Oakland Raiders players
Players of American football from Los Angeles
American Football League players